Sapphire Films Ltd. was a British television production company, active in the 1950s. Amongst their best-known series are The Adventures of Robin Hood,  The Adventures of Sir Lancelot, The Buccaneers, and The Four Just Men produced for ITC Entertainment and screened on ITV in the UK, as well as being syndicated in the United States.

Sapphire Films was founded by producer Hannah Weinstein with initial funds from the Hollywood branch of the Communist Party USA. Weinstein hired nearly two-dozen blacklisted American writers to script The Adventures of Robin Hood (and later The Four Just Men) under pseudonyms, and instituted elaborate security measures to ensure that the writers' true identities remained secret.

Sapphire Films ceased to function in late 1961 owing to financial problems caused by Weinstein's then husband, Jonthan Fisher.

Television Productions 
This list may not be complete

References

American communists
British communists
Hollywood blacklist
Television production companies of the United Kingdom